XF6 may refer to:

Aircraft 
Boeing XF6B, experimental biplane fighter
Curtiss F6C Hawk (experimental designations XF6C-4 to XF6C-7), biplane fighter
Grumman F6F Hellcat (experimental designations XF6F-1 to XF6F-6), monoplane fighter

Other uses 
The X Factor (British series 6), British TV series
Yamaha MOTIF XF6, electronic keyboard